Royal British Legion Industries (RBLI) is a charity based in the UK that helps Armed Forces veterans, disabled people and people who are unemployed. It runs a social enterprise, Britain's Bravest Manufacturing Company, a UK-wide employment support programme for Armed Forces veterans, LifeWorks, a variety of housing for veterans and their families, as well as running back-to-work support for people who have been long-term unemployed or have a disability/health condition.
RBLI's headquarters are in Aylesford, Kent, however they support the Armed Forces community nationwide. RBLI (charity number 210063) is a separate charity from The Royal British Legion (charity number 219279).

History 

RBLI was established in 1919 to support WW1 Armed Forces veterans fighting tuberculosis. First known as Industrial Settlements Inc, the charity was originally run from Preston Hall in Aylesford. 

Over time, the charity has expanded its charitable goals and now support veterans from many backgrounds, as well as people with disabilities and people who are unemployed. 

In 2011, RBLI's social enterprise, Britain's Bravest Manufacturing Company, took part in Operation Big Build, creating a lifesize replica of the GraveDigger in K'Nex.

In 2013 the charity won Charity of the Year at the Charity Times Awards.

In 2016, they relaunched their social enterprise, naming it Britain's Bravest Manufacturing Company, and gave evidence to the government's work and pensions committee regarding the disability employment gap.

In 2017, they opened 24 new apartments for wounded, injured and homeless veterans.

References 

British veterans' organisations
Veterans' affairs in the United Kingdom